Rollins Fork is an unincorporated community in King George County, Virginia, United States. The community is located along Virginia State Route 3 east of Index.

References

Unincorporated communities in Virginia
Unincorporated communities in King George County, Virginia